Matthew Semelsberger (born November 23, 1992) is an American mixed martial artist who competes in the Welterweight division of the Ultimate Fighting Championship.

Background
Semelsberger is a 2011 graduate of Urbana High School, where he competed in football, lacrosse, and wrestling. Excelling particularly in football, he led Urbana to a state championship win, and later played Division I-AA football with a scholarship at Marist College while majoring in criminal justice. However, he ended up dropping out at the beginning of his MMA career. At the age of 14, he entered an MMA program at a school close to home. Having done some years of youth wrestling, Matthew wanted to learn how to fight in case he ever found himself in a position where violence was his only option. After one of his wrestling buddies showed him his collection of the Ultimate Fighting Championship DVDs and VHS tapes, he was enamored with the sport and decided to start his goal of making the UFC.

Mixed martial arts career

Early career
Starting his professional career in 2017, Semelsberger compiled a 6-2 record in the regional East Coast scene, competing in such promotions like CFFC, where he won a close decision against Zulkarnaiyn Kamchybekov at CFFC 74, Maverick MMA where he won a bout against Kris Gratalo at Maverick MMA 15 after Gratalo threw in the towel between rounds due to a broken arm, and Art of War Cage Fighting, where Semelsberger picked up his final win before being given a UFC contract after knocking out Richard Patishnock at AoWCF 17.

Ultimate Fighting Championship
Semelsberger was initially scheduled to make his promotional debut against Philip Rowe at UFC on ESPN: Munhoz vs. Edgar on August 22, 2020. However, Rowe pulled out of the bout citing a toe injury and was replaced by Carlton Minus. Despite knocking Minus down in the first round, Semelsberger won the fight via unanimous decision.

Semelsberger made his sophomore appearance in the promotion against Jason Witt at UFC Fight Night: Edwards vs. Muhammad on March 14, 2021. He won the fight via first-minute knockout. This win earned him the Performance of the Night award.

Semelsberger faced Khaos Williams on June 19, 2021 at UFC on ESPN: The Korean Zombie vs. Ige. He lost the bout via unanimous decision.

Semelsberger faced Martin Sano Jr. on September 25, 2021 at UFC 266. He won the fight via knockout in round one.

Semelsberger faced A.J. Fletcher on March 12, 2022 at UFC Fight Night 203. He won the back-and-forth fight by unanimous decision.

Semelsberger faced Alex Morono on July 30, 2022 at UFC 277. He lost the fight by unanimous decision.

Semelsberger faced Jake Matthews on December 17, 2022 at UFC Fight Night 216. He won the fight via unanimous decision.

Championships and accomplishments

Mixed martial arts
Ultimate Fighting Championship
Performance of the night (One time)

Mixed martial arts record

|-
|Win
|align=center|11–4
|Jake Matthews
|Decision (unanimous)
|UFC Fight Night: Cannonier vs. Strickland
| 
|align=center|3
|align=center|5:00
|Las Vegas, Nevada, United States
|
|-
|Loss
|align=center|10–4
|Alex Morono
|Decision (unanimous)
|UFC 277
|
|align=center|3
|align=center|5:00
|Dallas, Texas, United States
|-
|Win
|align=center|10–3
|A.J. Fletcher
|Decision (unanimous)
|UFC Fight Night: Santos vs. Ankalaev
|
|align=center|3
|align=center|5:00
|Las Vegas, Nevada, United States
|
|-
| Win
| align=center|9–3
| Martin Sano Jr.
| KO (punch)
|UFC 266 
|
|align=center|1
|align=center|0:15
|Las Vegas, Nevada, United States
|
|-
| Loss
| align=center| 8–3
|Khaos Williams
| Decision (unanimous)
|UFC on ESPN: The Korean Zombie vs. Ige
|
|align=center|3
|align=center|5:00
|Las Vegas, Nevada, United States
|
|-
| Win
| align=center| 8–2
|Jason Witt
| KO (punch)
|UFC Fight Night: Edwards vs. Muhammad
|
|align=center|1
|align=center|0:16
|Las Vegas, Nevada, United States
| 
|-
| Win
| align=center|7–2
| Carlton Minus
|Decision (unanimous)
|UFC on ESPN: Munhoz vs. Edgar
|
|align=center|3
|align=center|5:00
|Las Vegas, Nevada, United States
|
|-
| Win
| align=center|6–2
| Richard Patishnock
| KO (punch)
| Art of War Cage Fighting 17
| 
| align=center|1
| align=center|2:14
| Philadelphia, Pennsylvania, United States
|
|-
| Win
| align=center| 5–2
| Kris Gratalo
| TKO (injury)
| Maverick MMA 15
| 
| align=center| 2
| align=center| 5:00
| Dickson City, Pennsylvania, United States
| 
|-
| Win
| align=center| 4–2
| Zulkarnaiyn Kamchybekov
| Decision (split)
| CFFC 74
|
|align=Center|3
|align=center|5:00
|Atlantic City, New Jersey, United States
| 
|-
| Loss
| align=center| 3–2
| Jerome Featherstone
| TKO (punches)
|Shogun Fights 20
|
|align=center|3
|align=center|4:09
|Baltimore, Maryland, United States
|
|-
| Win
| align=center| 3–1
| Scott Noble
| TKO (punches)
|Shogun Fights 18
|
|align=center|2
|align=center|4:53
|Baltimore, Maryland, United States
| 
|-
| Loss
| align=center| 2–1
| Darren Costa
|Submission (brabo choke)
| Shogun Fights 17
| 
| align=center| 3
| align=center| 1:23
| Baltimore, Maryland, United States
| 
|-
| Win
| align=center| 2–0
| Brian Maxwell
| Submission (heel hook)
| Strike Off 10
| 
| align=center| 3
| align=center| 1:43
| Manassas Park, Virginia, United States
|
|-
| Win
| align=center| 1–0
| Donelei Benedetto
| TKO (punches)
| Shogun Fights 16
| 
| align=center| 2
| align=center| 1:10
| Baltimore, Maryland, United States
|

See also 
 List of current UFC fighters
 List of male mixed martial artists

References

External links 
  
 

Living people
Welterweight mixed martial artists
Mixed martial artists utilizing Muay Thai
Mixed martial artists utilizing Brazilian jiu-jitsu
1992 births
Sportspeople from Rockville, Maryland
Mixed martial artists from Maryland
American male mixed martial artists
Ultimate Fighting Championship male fighters
American Muay Thai practitioners
American practitioners of Brazilian jiu-jitsu